Talat Ali Malik (born 29 May 1950 in Lahore, Punjab) is a former Pakistani cricketer who played in ten Tests from 1972 to 1979. He served as international match referee as well. He was the manager of the Pakistan Cricket Team from October 2006 until his resignation 17 October 2008 following the Quadrangular four-nation Twenty20 series in Canada, in which Pakistan lost to Sri Lanka in the final

References

1950 births
Living people
Pakistan Test cricketers
Pakistani cricketers
Lahore Greens cricketers
Punjab University cricketers
Pakistan International Airlines cricketers
Pakistan International Airlines A cricketers
Habib Bank Limited cricketers
Punjab (Pakistan) cricketers
Cricketers from Lahore
Cricket match referees